Rashg may refer to:
 Rashg-e Sarney
 Rashg-e Shavur

See also
 Rashk (disambiguation)